The COE version of the International 9000 is a series of cabover trucks that were produced by International Harvester and its corporate successor Navistar.  Introduced in 1981 as the replacement for the Transtar II COE, two generations of the model line were produced in North America until 1998.  Subsequent production continued into the 21st century in worldwide markets, where more restrictive length laws still favor the use of the configuration.

First generation (CO9600/CO9670; 1981-1988) 

For 1981, International Harvester introduced the CO9670 cabover to replace the Transtar II CO4070 in production since 1974.  Sharing its doors with the Transtar 4300, the C09670 featured a wider cab, and larger windows and windshield.  The trapezoidal grille used on all large International cabovers since 1965 was redesigned to include the headlights.

In place of the massive Cummins KT450 and Caterpillar 3408 engines included on the Transtar II, the CO9670 was powered by the smaller-displacement 855 cubic-inch N-Series Cummins diesel.  In twin-turbocharged configuration, the engine produced 475 hp.

In 1989, Navistar updated the CO9670, rebranding it the International 9600.

Second generation (9700/9800; 1988-1998) 

For 1988, Navistar redesigned the 9000-series cabovers, allowing for the addition of a set-back front axle version.  Although visually similar to the 9600 from the axles above, the 9700 was given many aerodynamic enhancements, including lower body skirting, an enhanced front bumper, and faired-in front turn signals.  The front-axle configuration allowed for a complete redesign of the interior, allowing for a completely flat floor; Navistar was one of the first American manufacturers to market a cabover truck without an intrusion from the engine separating the driver and passenger seats, allowing walk-in access to the sleeper compartment.  As an option, Navistar offered a sleeper compartment with a roof extending above the front seats.

After 1998 production, the 9700 and 9800 were withdrawn from the 9000 series as International exited COE production in North America.

Third generation (9800i; 1999-2015) 

Following the discontinuation of the 9000-series COE in the North American market, Navistar continued cabover production by sending the tooling for the model line to Brazil.  Outside of Brazil, the 9800i was exported throughout South America, with right-hand drive production exported to Australia and South Africa.

Sharing much of the cab of the previous generation, the third generation shed the trapezoidal grille design of International COEs used since 1965 in favor of a square grille (in line with 9000i-series conventionals).

In 2015, production of the 9800i was halted.  In August 2017, the truck was still sold in South Africa.

References 

International Harvester vehicles
Navistar International vehicles
Vehicles introduced in 1981
Trucks of the United States